Several French vessels named Adèle operated in the Indian Ocean theatre in the late 18th century-early 19th century. At least two were privateer brigs that the British Royal Navy captured, one in November 1800 and the other in December 1807. This article concerns the second Adèle

Origins
Adèle was built in Mauritius and registered and owned by the firm of Merle, Cabot & Co.

Adèle

In 1803 Adèle sailed from the Isle de France (now Mauritius), to Port Jackson, New Holland, under the command of Louis Ruault Coutance, a former naval officer (Lieutenant de vaisseau). Her cargo consisted of 4,000 gallons of rum, 430 gallons of Cape wine, together with 6,000 lbs of sugar, 40 casks of meat, 11 anchors, a case of jewellery and a considerable quantity of cloth. She arrived at Port Jackson on 16 July 1803, and left on 4 September to return to Martinique. 

On 24 June 1807, the "corsair , owner Bonaffé," advertised that she was about to leave on a cruise in July and needed 15 Mozambiquers for her crew.

Adèle captured Cartier in October. Cartier became Caravan, which  recaptured in May 1809.

On 5 December  captured Adèle. Captain Caulfield, of Russell, reported that he had captured Adèle in the Indian Ocean, about 135 km off the coast of Burma. Adèle had sailed from Isle de France on 14 July, and carried "seven months water and provisions for one hundred and fifty men".

Fate
In 1819, the vessel L'Adele, belonging to Calcutta and of 275 tons (bm), was lost on the west coast of Sumatra.

Citations and references
Citations

References
Phipps, John, (of the Master Attendant's Office, Calcutta), (1840) A Collection of Papers Relative to Ship Building in India ...: Also a Register Comprehending All the Ships ... Built in India to the Present Time .... (Scott).
 

Privateer ships of France
Captured ships
1800s ships